The following is a list of schools in the Indian state of Delhi.
 Adarsh Public School, Vikaspuri
 Adarsh Shiksha Niketan School
 Air Force Bal Bharati School, Lodhi Road
 Air Force Golden Jubilee Institute, Subroto Park
 The Air Force School
 Amity International School
 Anglo Arabic Senior Secondary School, Ajmeri Gate
 Army Public School, Dhaula Kuan
 Army Public School, Delhi Cantt
 Bal Bhavan International School, Dwarka Sub City
 Balvantray Mehta Vidya Bhawan ASMA
 Bharatiya Vidya Bhavan's Mehta Vidyalaya
 Bharti Public School
 Bluebells School
 Carmel Convent School
 Convent of Jesus and Mary, Delhi
 D.A.V. Public School, Pushpanjali Enclave
 Darbari Lal DAV Model School
 Delhi Public School Rohini
 Delhi Public School, Mathura Road
 Delhi Public School, R. K. Puram
 Delhi Public School, Vasant Kunj
 DTEA Senior Secondary School(s)
 Don Bosco School
 Doon Public School
 Faith Academy, Delhi
 Fr. Agnel School, New Delhi
 Free School Under the Bridge
 G.B.S.S.School No.1,Shakti Nagar
 Greenfields Senior Secondary School
 Guru Harkrishan Public School
 Guru Harkrishan Public School, Nanak Piao
 Guru Nanak Public School
 Gyan Bharati School, Saket
 Hamdard Public School
 Holy Child Auxilium School, Vasant Vihar
 Holy Cross School (Najafgarh)
 Hope Hall Foundation School, R. K. Puram
 Kendriya Vidyalaya
 Kulachi Hansraj Model School
 Lady Irwin School
 Loreto Convent School, Delhi
 Mata Jai Kaur Public School
 Mater Dei School, New Delhi
 Manav Sthali School
 Manava Bharati India International School
 Mann Public School
 Modern School (New Delhi)
 Montfort Senior Secondary School
 The Mother's International School, New Delhi
 Mount Carmel School
 N. C. Jindal Public School
 Navy Children School, Chanakyapuri
 New Era Public School, Mayapuri
 Presentation Convent Senior Secondary School, Delhi
 R D Rajpal public school
 Rajkiya Pratibha Vikas Vidyalaya, Shalimar Bagh, Delhi
 Raisina Bengali Senior Secondary School, Gole Market, New Delhi
 Rukmini Devi Public School, Pitampura, New Delhi
 Sahoday Senior Secondary School, SDA, Hauz Khas, New Delhi 
 Salwan Public School
 Sanskriti School
 Sardar Patel Vidyalaya
 The Shri Ram School
 Springdales School
 Saint Giri Senior Secondary School
 St. Columba's School
 St. Francis De Sales School
 St. Paul's School, New Delhi
 St. John's Sr. Sec. School
 St. Mark's Senior Secondary Public School
 St. Mark's Senior Secondary School, Janakpuri
 St. Thomas' School (New Delhi)
 St. Xavier's School, Delhi
 St. Xavier's School, Rohini
 Summer Fields School, New Delhi
 Tagore International School, New Delhi
 Vasant Valley School

See also
List of schools in Delhi affiliated with CBSE

References

Delhi
Schools in Delhi
Schools